James Johnston (~1721 – 13 December 1797) was a general in the British Army.

Family
He was the only surviving son of Captain George Johnston, an army agent at Dublin descended from the Johnstons of Hilton in Berwickshire, by his wife Hester Bland, daughter of James Bland, Dean of Ardfert and great-aunt to Dorothea Jordan. His sister Mary married Francis Napier, 6th Lord Napier. His paternal grandfather was Sir Patrick Johnston, three times Lord Provost of Edinburgh.

Career
Johnston joined the army as a cornet in the 13th Regiment of Dragoons on 5 October 1736, and transferred to the Royal Dragoons in 1739, where he rose to the rank of major. On 2 December 1754 he was promoted to lieutenant-colonel of the 13th Dragoons, then on 7 April 1759 went back to the Royal Dragoons as lieutenant-colonel, commanding the regiment in Germany under Duke Ferdinand of Brunswick. He served with distinction at the Battle of Warburg on 31 July 1760 and was wounded at the Battle of Kloster Kampen on 15 October. He was appointed Lieutenant Governor of Nevis in April 1761 (and so was briefly responsible for the juveniles Alexander Hamilton and Frances Herbert Woolward 1761–1831) was promoted to colonel on 19 February 1762 and granted local rank as a major-general, commanding a cavalry brigade in the campaign of 1762. As a mark of esteem he was given a gold snuff-box by Brunswick's nephew Hereditary Prince Charles.

Johnston was appointed Lieutenant-Governor of Minorca in 1763, promoted major-general in April 1770, and made colonel of the 9th Regiment of Dragoons on 2 January 1771. He was retired from his responsibilities for Minorca and made governor of (the garrison at) Quebec on 21 November 1774, though manifestly gazetted Governor of Quebec, the lesser position he held until his death in 1797. He transferred as colonel to the 1st Irish Horse on 27 April 1775 and was promoted lieutenant-general in September 1777. On 14 April 1778 he became colonel of the 6th (Inniskilling) Regiment of Dragoons. 'Irish' Johnston was promoted full general in 1793. On his death he was succeeded as Governor of Quebec by Staats Long Morris.

James Johnston was one of the most celebrated swordsmen of his day. On 5 May 1763, he married Lady Henrietta West, daughter of Lord De La Warr, leaving issue; his widow died in 1817. General Johnston died at Hampton 13 September 1797 in his 77th year and was buried in Westminster Abbey on 21 December 1797.

Note

 Further resources: 
Military commissions of James Johnston, 5 October 1736—12 October 1793. Hertfordshire Archives and Local Studies DE/HL/15994-16003
Appointment as Governor of Quebec, Hertfordshire Archives and Local Studies DE/HL/16008

References

1720s births
1797 deaths
British Army generals
British Army personnel of the Seven Years' War
13th Hussars officers
1st The Royal Dragoons officers
9th Queen's Royal Lancers officers
4th Royal Irish Dragoon Guards officers
6th (Inniskilling) Dragoons officers
Burials at Westminster Abbey
Irish colonial officials
Irish soldiers
Military personnel from Dublin (city)
Governors of Nevis